Horace Baker may refer to:
 Horace Baker (politician) (1869–1941), American politician, acting governor of New Jersey
 Horace Baker (footballer) (1910–1974), English footballer
 Horace Burrington Baker (1889–1971), American malacologist